The wildlife of the Democratic Republic of the Congo includes its flora and fauna, comprising a large biodiversity in rainforests, seasonally flooded forests and grasslands. 

The country is considered one of the 17 megadiverse nations, and is one of the most flora rich countries on the African continent. Its rainforests harbour many rare and endemic species, such as the chimpanzee and the bonobo.  It is home for more than 10,000 types of plants, 600 timber species, as well as 1,000 bird species, 280 reptile species, and 400 mammal species, including the forest elephant, gorilla, forest buffalo, bongo, and okapi. Many of these wildlife species are threatened animals such as large lowland gorillas and chimpanzees.

Five of the country's national parks are listed as World Heritage Sites: the Garumba, Kahuzi-Biega, Salonga and Virunga National Parks, and Okapi Wildlife Reserve. All five sites are listed by UNESCO as World Heritage In Danger.

Several environmental issues in the DRC threaten wildlife, including overhunting for bushmeat, deforestation, mining and armed conflict. The civil war and resultant poor economic conditions have endangered much of the country's biodiversity. Many park wardens were either killed or could not afford to continue their work.

Fauna

The ecoregion is home to the endangered western lowland gorilla (Gorilla gorilla gorilla), the endangered eastern lowland gorilla (Gorilla berengei graueri), African forest elephant (Loxodonta cyclotis), and okapi (Okapia johnstoni).

Animals native to the Democratic Republic of the Congo:

 Aardvark
 African brush-tailed porcupine
 African buffalo
 African bullfrog
 African civet
 African clawed frog
 African dwarf frog
 African golden cat
 African helmeted turtle
 African leopard
 African manatee
 African palm civet
 African rock python
 African soft-furred rat
 African softshell turtle
 African striped weasel
 African tree toad
 Allen's swamp monkey
 Angola colobus
 Aubry's flapshell turtle
 Ball python
 Banded mongoose
 Banded water cobra
 Bili ape
 Black-and-white colobus
 Black-collared lovebird
 Black mamba
 Black-necked spitting cobra
 Blue duiker
 Blue-headed wood dove
 Blue monkey
 Bohor reedbuck
 Bongo
 Bonobo
 Bushpig
 Cape bushbuck
 Cape hyrax
 Central African oyan
 Chameleon
 Chimpanzee
 Common agama
 Common duiker
 Common egg eater
 Common eland
 Congo peafowl
 Congo water cobra
 Crocodile
 Dwarf crocodile
 Nile crocodile
 Slender snouted crocodile
 De Brazza's monkey
 Egyptian fruit bat
 African forest elephant
 Western gorilla
 Gaboon viper
 Gallagher's free-tailed bat
 Giant eland
 Giant forest hog
 Giant otter shrew
 Goliath beetle
 Grant's zebra
 Greater cane rat
 Greater kudu
 Great Lakes bush viper
 Green bush viper
 Green mamba
 Grey parrot
 Handsome spurfowl
 Hartebeest
 Hedgehog leaf-toed gecko
 Hippopotamus
 Honey badger
 Jameson's mamba
 Johnston's chameleon
 Katanga Mountain bush viper
 Kob
 Kordofan giraffe
 Leopard tortoise
 Lesser flamingo
 Lichtenstein's hartebeest
 Lion
 Many-banded snake
 Marsh mongoose
 Monitor lizard
 Angolan white-throated monitor
 Nile monitor
 Savannah monitor
 Moustached monkey
 Northern white rhinoceros
 Okapi
 Olive baboon
 Oribi
 Pangolin
 Giant pangolin
 Long-tailed pangolin
 Tree pangolin
 Patas monkey
 Puff adder
 Puku
 Red river hog
 Roan antelope
 Rock hyrax
 Rough-scaled bush viper
 Sable antelope
 Serval
 Side-striped jackal
 Sitatunga
 Southern reedbuck
 Spectral pygmy chameleon
 Spotted hyena
 Strange-horned chameleon
 Stuhlmann's golden mole
 Topi
 Tropical spiny agama
 Trumpeter hornbill
 Upemba lechwe
 Upemba mud turtle
 Warthog
 Waterbuck
 Yellow-backed duiker

Birds

Butterflies

See also
 Centre National d'Appui au Développement et à la Participation populaire
Acapoeta tanganicae
Labeo simpsoni

References

External links
A blog on bonobo research in Congo

The Digitised Flora of Central Africa

Biota of the Democratic Republic of the Congo
Congo